Curtin is a 2007 television film about John Curtin, the Prime Minister of Australia during the Second World War. The film won the Australian Screen Sound Guild Award in 2007 for its sound team.

Plot
The film covers the period from just before Curtin becoming Prime Minister in October 1941 until the return of the 6th and 7th Divisions to Australia (Operation Stepsister) at the start of the Pacific war in March 1942. The film concludes with a montage of footage of Curtin's funeral in 1945.

Cast
William McInnes as John Curtin
Noni Hazlehurst as Elsie Curtin
Asher Keddie as Elsie Jnr
Ben Esler as John Jnr
Geoff Morrell as Ben Chifley
Bille Brown as Robert Menzies
Paul English as H. V. Evatt
Frank Gallacher as Jack Beasley
William Zappa as General Vernon Sturdee
Shingo Usami as Tatsuo Kawai
Robert Grubb as Percy Spender
Tony Rickards as Eddie Ward
Drew Lindo as Arthur Fadden
Alethea McGrath as Mrs. Needham
Dan Wyllie as Don Rodgers
Brian Meegan as Frederick Shedden
Roz Hammond as Gladys Joyce
Nicholas Opolski as Fred McLaughlin
Hunter Perske as Don Whitington

Production
Much of the film was made in Victoria, with the exception of scenes filmed at Old Parliament House, Canberra.

References

External links

Curtin at Australian Screen Online

2007 drama films
2007 films
2007 television films
2000s war drama films
Australian biographical films
Australian war drama films
Australian drama television films
Biographical films about prime ministers
Cultural depictions of Australian men
Films set in the Australian Capital Territory
Films set in Western Australia
Films set in 1941
Films set in 1942
Pacific War films
World War II films based on actual events